Indiana Dunes National Park is a National Park Service unit on the shore of Lake Michigan in Indiana, United States. A BioBlitz took place there on May 15 and 16, 2009. During that time, a list of organisms was compiled which included invertebrates.

List of invertebrates other than insects and arachnids

Mollusks

For the list of mollusk species - snails, slugs, clams and mussels - please see List of non-marine mollusks of the Indiana Dunes.

Millipedes

 Diplopoda sp. - millipedes	
 Narceus americanus - North American millipede.

Other invertebrates

 Trichuridae - roundworms

See also
List of crustaceans of the Indiana Dunes
List of Arachnids of the Indiana Dunes
Insects of the Indiana Dunes
List of non-marine mollusks of the Indiana Dunes

Notes

External links
Indiana Dunes National Lakeshore
Indiana Dunes State Park
Dunes Nature Preserve

Indiana